Platy is a small village on Lemnos island in Greece. It is located in the southwestern part of the island, between the village of Thanos and the main city, Myrina. The village's population ranges from about 200 people during winter to about 600 during summer. 

Populated places in Lemnos